For the Operating System, see Solus (operating system).

The Solus Project is a first-person single-player survival video game developed by Teotl Studios and Grip Games. An early access version of the game was released on Steam, Xbox One and GOG in February 2016, and the full version of the game was released on June 7, 2016 on PC and July 15, 2016 for Xbox One . The game is a spiritual successor to previous Teotl title, The Ball.

Gameplay 
The Solus Project is an advanced environmental survival-adventure game, in which the player controls an astronaut on a mission to save mankind. Their spacecraft crashes on an uncharted, alien planet, Gliese-6143-C. They have to survive on the planet and faces factors such as hunger level, thirst, body temperature or weather conditions. The player explores the planet full of temples and other interesting places. Your character is the lone survivor of a crew looking for a colony, as mankind is on the verge of extinction. Plants grow and rot, weather changes from scorching heat to chilling storms, and the wind and humidity are unforgiving. Craft items, explore vast areas, monitor your health, sleep regularly and more.

Learn the secrets of a mysterious alien civilization that might hold the key to mankind's survival.

Reception
The Solus Project has a score of 68, a "Mixed or Average" rating on Metacritic, based upon 27 reviews.
We Got This Covered awarded it a score of three and a half out of five stars, saying "Despite mechanical discord and an unsatisfying story, the creepy atmosphere and gargantuan spectacle of The Solus Project is worth experiencing firsthand." The game has currently received a four star rating on GOG.com and a 'Very Positive' rating on Steam.

The Solus Project has 3 nominations for Czech Game of the Year Awards. It is nominated in categories Best audio, Best story and Best visuals.

References

External links 

Early access video games
Indie video games
PlayStation 4 games
Science fiction video games
Survival video games
Unreal Engine games
2016 video games
Video games developed in Sweden
Video games developed in the Czech Republic
Video games set on fictional planets
Windows games
Xbox One games
Grip Digital games
Single-player video games